Carlo Falconi (1622 – January 1677) was a Roman Catholic prelate who served as Bishop of Castellaneta (1673–1677).

Biography
Carlo Falconi was born in Civitate Ducali, Italy in 1622 and ordained a priest on 11 March 1673.
On 13 March 1673, he was appointed during the papacy of Pope Clement X as Bishop of Castellaneta.
He served as Bishop of Castellaneta  until his death in January 1677.

References

External links and additional sources
 (for Chronology of Bishops) 
 (for Chronology of Bishops) 

17th-century Italian Roman Catholic bishops
Bishops appointed by Pope Clement X
1622 births
1677 deaths